Mohammad Afiq bin Yunos (born 10 December 1990) is a Singaporean professional footballer who plays for the Singapore national team as a centre-back.

Before he was included in the LionsXII setup, Afiq was playing with Young Lions in S.League.

Club career

Young Lions
Afiq began his professional football career with Under-23 side Young Lions in the S.League in 2008.

LionsXII
It was announced that Afiq was to join the LionsXII for the 2014 Malaysia Super League.

Tampines Rovers
In 2016, Afiq signed for Tampines Rovers for the 2016 S.League campaign after LionsXII was disbanded in 2015. He has rejoined the Stags by signing a three-year contract from the 2018 season, having spent 2017 playing for Home United.

Geylang International 
Afiq was loaned out to Geylang International in June 2018 from Tampines Rovers for the rest of the season.

Hougang United
Afiq signed with Hougang United for the 2019 season, joining a slew of big-name signings for the club.

Trat FC
Afiq then signed for Thailand side Trat FC for the 2020 Thai League 1 season, on loan from the Cheetahs.

Geylang International 
On 8 July 2021, Afiq return to Geylang International on a permanent transfer from Hougang United for the remainder of the 2021 season.

Career statistics

Club

. Caps and goals may not be correct.

 Young Lions are ineligible for qualification to AFC competitions.

International

International career
He was called to Singapore national football team when the team was participating 2010 AFF Championship. Afiq was also called up to the Singapore U-23 side in the 2013 Southeast Asian Games.

Others

Singapore Selection Squad
He was selected as part of the Singapore Selection squad for The Sultan of Selangor’s Cup to be held on 6 May 2017.

References

External links 
 
 Personal details 

1990 births
Living people
Singaporean footballers
Singapore international footballers
LionsXII players
Singapore Premier League players
Malaysia Super League players
Young Lions FC players
Association football central defenders
Singaporean people of Malay descent
Footballers at the 2010 Asian Games
Footballers at the 2014 Asian Games
Southeast Asian Games bronze medalists for Singapore
Southeast Asian Games medalists in football
Competitors at the 2013 Southeast Asian Games
Asian Games competitors for Singapore